Northwest Catholic High School (NWC) is a private, Roman Catholic, co-educational high school in West Hartford, Connecticut, United States. It was established in 1961 and is located in the Roman Catholic Archdiocese of Hartford.

Notable alumni 

 John L. Flannery, business executive
 Mike Golic Jr., broadcaster and NFL player

References

External links 
 

Buildings and structures in West Hartford, Connecticut
Catholic secondary schools in Connecticut
Schools in Hartford County, Connecticut
Educational institutions established in 1961
1961 establishments in Connecticut